Bactris longiseta, the huiscoyol, is a species of flowering plant in the family Arecaceae. It is found in Costa Rica and Nicaragua around Estero Real Natural Reserve. It is threatened by habitat loss.

References

longiseta
Flora of Costa Rica
Vulnerable plants
Taxonomy articles created by Polbot
Taxa named by Max Burret